Espuela de gallo is a common name for several plants and may refer to:
 
Machaerium cirrhiferum
Machaerium nyctitans